Legio IX Hispana ("9th Spanish Legion"), also written Legio VIIII Hispana, was a legion of the Imperial Roman army that existed from the 1st century BC until at least 120 AD. The legion fought in various provinces of the late Roman Republic and early Roman Empire. It was stationed in Britain following the Roman invasion in 43 AD. The legion disappears from surviving Roman records after  and there is no extant account of what happened to it.

The unknown fate of the legion has been the subject of considerable research and speculation. One theory (per historian Theodor Mommsen) was that the legion was wiped out in action in northern Britain soon after 108 AD, the date of the latest datable inscription of the Ninth found in Britain, perhaps during a rising of northern tribes against Roman rule. This view was popularised by the 1954 novel The Eagle of the Ninth in which the legion is said to have marched into Caledonia (modern day Scotland), after which it was "never heard of again".

The Nijmegen evidence has led to suggestions that IX Hispana was destroyed in later conflicts of the 2nd century. Suggestions include the Bar Kokhba revolt (132–135 AD) or Marcus Aurelius's war against Parthia (161–166 AD) in Armenia. However, some scholars have ascribed the Nijmegen evidence to a mere detachment of IX Hispana, not the whole legion.

In any event, it is clear that the IX Hispana did not exist during the reign of the emperor Septimius Severus (r. 193–211 AD), as it is not included in two identical but independent lists of the 33 legions existing in this period.

Republican army (to 30 BC) 
The origin of the legion is uncertain, but a 9th legion seems to have participated in the siege of Asculum during the Social War in 90 BC.

When Julius Caesar became governor of Cisalpine Gaul in 58 BC, he inherited four legions, numbered VII, VIII, IX, X, that were already based there. The Ninth (IX) may have been quartered in Aquileia "to guard against attacks from the Illyrians". Caesar created two more legions (XI and XII), using all six for his attack on the Helvetii initiating the Gallic wars.

The Caesarian Ninth Legion fought in the battles of Dyrrhachium and Pharsalus (48 BC) and in the African campaign of 46 BC. After his final victory, Caesar disbanded the legion and settled the veterans in the area of Picenum.

Following Caesar's assassination, Caesar's ally Ventidius Bassus made attempts to recreate the 7th, 8th, and 9th legions, but "it is not clear that any of these survived even to the time of Philippi".
Octavian later recalled the veterans of the Ninth to fight against the rebellion of Sextus Pompeius in Sicily. After defeating Sextus, they were sent to the province of Macedonia. The Ninth remained with Octavian in his war of 31 BC against Mark Antony and fought by his side in the Battle of Actium.

Imperial Roman army (30 BC – AD 130?) 

With Octavian, whom the Senate later titled Augustus, established as sole ruler of the Roman world, the legion was sent to Hispania to take part in the large-scale campaign against the Cantabrians (25–19 BC). The nickname Hispana ("stationed in Hispania") is first found during the reign of Augustus and probably originated at that time.

After this, the legion was probably part of the imperial army in the Rhine borderlands that was campaigning against the Germanic tribes. Following the abandonment of the eastern Rhine area (after the disastrous Battle of the Teutoburg Forest in AD 9), the Ninth was relocated in Pannonia.

Britain (AD 43 – at least 108) 

In AD 43, the legion most likely participated in the Roman invasion of Britain led by the emperor Claudius and general Aulus Plautius, because they soon appear amongst the provincial garrison. In AD 50, the Ninth was one of two legions that defeated the forces of Caratacus at Caer Caradoc. Around the same year, the legion constructed a fort, Lindum Colonia, at Lincoln. Under the command of Caesius Nasica they put down the first revolt of Venutius, king of the Brigantes tribe, between 52 and 57.

The Ninth suffered a serious defeat at the Battle of Camulodunum under Quintus Petillius Cerialis in the rebellion of Boudica (61), when most of the foot-soldiers were killed in a disastrous attempt to relieve the besieged city of Camulodunum (Colchester). Only the cavalry escaped. The legion was later reinforced with legionaries from the Germania provinces. When Cerialis returned as governor of Britain ten years later, he took command of the Ninth once more in a successful campaign against the Brigantes in 71–72, to subdue north-central Britain. Around this time they constructed a new fortress at York (Eboracum), as shown by finds of tile-stamps from the site.

The Ninth participated in Agricola's invasion of Caledonia (modern Scotland) in 82–83. According to Tacitus, the legion narrowly escaped destruction when the Caledonians beyond the Forth launched a surprise attack at night on their fort. The Caledonians "burst upon them as they were terrified in their sleep". In desperate hand-to-hand fighting the Caledonians entered the camp, but Agricola was able to send cavalry to relieve the legion. Seeing the relief force, "the men of the Ninth Legion recovered their spirit, and sure of their safety, fought for glory", pushing back the Caledonians.
The legion also participated in the decisive Battle of Mons Graupius.

The last attested activity of the Ninth in Britain is during the rebuilding in stone of the legionary fortress at York (Eboracum) in 108. This is recorded in an inscribed stone tablet discovered in 1864, now displayed in the Yorkshire Museum in York.

Germania Inferior (108? – 130?)

Several inscriptions attesting IX Hispana have been found in the site of the legionary fortress on the lower Rhine river at Noviomagus Batavorum (Nijmegen, Netherlands). These include some tile-stamps (dated 104–120); and a silver-plated bronze pendant, found in the 1990s, that was part of a phalera (military medal), with "LEG HISP IX" inscribed on the reverse. In addition, an altar to Apollo, dating from this period, was found at nearby Aquae Granni (Aachen, Germany), erected in fulfillment of a vow, by Lucius Latinius Macer, who describes himself as primus pilus (chief centurion) and as  praefectus castrorum ("prefect of the camp", i.e. third-in-command) of IX Hispana. (it was commonplace for chief centurions, on completion of their single-year term of office, to be promoted to praefectus castrorum).

The archaeological evidence thus appears to indicate that elements of IX Hispana were present at Noviomagus sometime after 104 AD (when the previous incumbent legion, X Gemina, was transferred to the Danube) and that IX was probably replaced by a detachment of legion XXX Ulpia Victrix not long after 120 AD.
Less clear is whether the whole IX legion was at Nijmegen or simply a detachment. The evidence for the presence of senior officers such as Macer convinced several scholars that the Ninth Legion as a whole was based there between 121 and 130. It may have been both: first a detachment, later followed by the rest of the legion: a vexillatio Britannica ("British detachment") is also attested at Nijmegen in this period. However, it is unclear whether this detachment was drawn from the IX Hispana (and its attached auxiliary regiments) alone, or from a mix of various British-based units.

Theories about the Ninth's disappearance 

The Nijmegen finds, dating to c. 120, were, in 2015, the latest records of Legion IX found. The Ninth was apparently no longer in existence after 197. Two lists of the legions survive from this era, one inscribed on a column found in Rome (CIL VI 3492) and the other a list of legions in existence "today" provided by the contemporary Greco-Roman historian Dio Cassius, writing c. 210–232 (Roman History LV.23–24). Both these lists date from after 197, as both include the 3 Parthica legions founded by Septimius Severus in that year. Both lists provide an identical list of 33 legions. Neither includes a "IX Hispana". It thus appears that IX Hispana disappeared sometime in the period 120–197.

The traditional theory is that the Ninth was destroyed in a war on Britain's northern frontier against the indigenous Celtic tribes. According to the eminent 19th-century German classicist Theodor Mommsen, "under Hadrian there was a terrible catastrophe here, apparently an attack on the fortress of Eboracum [York] and the annihilation of the legion stationed there, the very same Ninth that had fought so unluckily in the Boudican revolt." He suggested that a revolt of the Brigantes soon after 108 was the most likely explanation. Mommsen cited as evidence the Roman historian Marcus Cornelius Fronto, writing in the 160s AD, who told the emperor Marcus Aurelius: "Indeed, when your grandfather Hadrian held imperial power, what great numbers of soldiers were killed by the Jews, what great numbers by the Britons". The emperor Hadrian (r. 117–138) visited Britain in person around 122 AD, when he launched the construction of Hadrian's Wall because, according to one Roman source,  "the Britons could not be kept under Roman control". It is plausible that Hadrian was responding to a military disaster.
However, there is no archaeological evidence of it around 120.

Mommsen's thesis was published long before the first traces of IX Hispana were found at Nijmegen. As a result of these, and of inscriptions proving that two senior officers, who were deputy commanders of the Ninth in c. 120, lived on for several decades to lead distinguished public careers, led to the Mommsen theory falling out of favour with many scholars. These now suggest later conflicts in other theatres as possible scenes of IX Hispana's demise:
 The Second Jewish Revolt against the Romans in Judea that broke out in 132. It was reported that the Romans suffered heavy casualties in this war, whose start-date fits neatly with the estimated time of IX Hispana's departure from Nijmegen (120–130). In this scenario, the Ninth may have been dispatched to Judea to reinforce the locally based legions, but was heavily defeated by Jewish forces and the remnants of the unit disbanded. However, another legion, XXII Deiotariana, normally based in Egypt, is actually documented in Judea at this time and its surviving datable records also cease c. 120. It is possible that both legions were destroyed by the Jews, but if so this would rate as the worst Roman military disaster since the Battle of the Teutoburg Forest (AD 9) when 3 legions were lost.
 The emperor Marcus Aurelius' Parthian War (161–166) against King Vologases IV. According to Greco-Roman historian Cassius Dio, a  Parthian army led by the general Chosroes surrounded and annihilated an unspecified Roman legion in Armenia. This led to the suicide of its commander, the governor of Cappadocia, Marcus Sedatius Severianus. At this time, there were two legions permanently stationed in Cappadocia, the XII Fulminata and the XV Apollinaris. Both these units are attested as operational well beyond AD 200, so neither could have been the legion destroyed by the Parthians. The theory that the Ninth was the lost legion has the drawback that there is a complete lack of evidence that the Ninth was present in the East in the period 130–160. Some scholars argue that the legion referred to by Dio was the XXII Deiotariana, but if so, the latter could not have been annihilated by the Jews thirty years earlier.

Several scholars continue to argue that destruction in Britain is the most likely scenario for the Ninth's disappearance. Russell argues that "by far the most plausible answer to the question 'what happened to the Ninth' is that they fought and died in Britain, disappearing in the late 110s or early 120s when the province was in disarray".
Such scholars criticise the assumptions of those who extrapolate from inscription evidence, arguing that it is easy to confuse evidence about different persons with the same name. It is highly unlikely that if the legion continued in existence up to the Armenian war of 161, no records at all later than c. 120 would be known. Keppie says that "no inscriptions recording the building activities of the legion or the lives and careers of its members have come from the East", suggesting that if the legion did leave Britain, it ceased to exist very soon afterwards. Russell argues that "there is no evidence that the Ninth were ever taken out of Britain." He has claimed that the tile stamps found at Nijmegen cannot be dated to the period after 120, but "all seem to date to the 80s AD, when detachments of the Ninth were indeed on the Rhine fighting Germanic tribes." Keppie also says that the tiles cannot be securely dated, but suggests that they date from c. 105 during a temporary absence of the legion from Britain.
However, Keppie does not support the theory that the legion met its end in Britain. He suggests that the legion may have been withdrawn from York around 117 to take part in the war in Parthia at the end of Trajan's reign. Keppie suggests that it was the legion's absence elsewhere that encouraged a native uprising, obliging Hadrian to send the Legio VI Victrix to Britain.

The fate of the Ninth remains the subject of vigorous debate among scholars. Frere noted in 1967, "further evidence is needed before more can be said".

Known members

Epigraphic inscriptions

 Monumentum / (...) Quirina Quintillus miles legionis IX Hispanae annorum (...) Pisoni filius posuit (...). Leon (Legionem)

In fiction and popular culture
The Ninth Legion's mysterious disappearance has made it a popular subject for historical fiction, fantasy and science fiction.

 In Rosemary Sutcliff's 1954 historical novel The Eagle of the Ninth, a young Roman officer, Marcus Flavius Aquila, is trying to recover the Eagle standard of his father's legion beyond Hadrian's Wall.
 A Home Service radio dramatisation of  The Eagle of the Ninth was broadcast on Children's Hour in about 1956.
 In Alan Garner's 1973 novel Red Shift, one narrative involves a group of Roman soldiers who are survivors of the Legion's destruction, trying to survive in hostile, 2nd-century Cheshire.
 In Karl Edward Wagner's 1976 fantasy novel Legion from the Shadows (featuring Robert E. Howard's Bran Mak Morn), the survivors of the Ninth flee underground where they interbreed with the Worms of the Earth.
 A BBC television serial was made of The Eagle of the Ninth in 1977.
 The 1979 historical novel Legions of the Mists by Amanda Cockrell recounts the destruction of the Ninth Hispania by an attack by combined tribes in Scotland.
 In David Gemmell's "Stones of Power" historical fantasy series, (1988–1991) the Ninth have been trapped in Limbo and are released by the protagonists (Uther Pendragon in Ghost King and Alexander the Great in Dark Prince (1991)) to help in battles.
 In Will Murray's 1993 Doc Savage novel, The Forgotten Realm, the Ninth Hispana founded a city called Novum Eboracum ("New York") in the African Congo, surviving until at least the 1930s.
 A full-cast radio dramatization of The Eagle of the Ninth was broadcast by BBC Radio 4 in 1996.
 In Marion Zimmer Bradley's Lady of Avalon historical fantasy novel, (1997) the Ninth is destroyed in a battle with the native Britons, from which the hero Gawen escapes to return to Avalon.
 In Susanna Kearsley's 1997 novel The Shadowy Horses, an archaeologist believes he has found the remains of a fort that housed the Ninth Legion in remote Eyemouth, Scotland.
 N. M. Browne's 2000 Warriors of Alavna accounts for the disappearance of the Legion by transporting it to an alternative reality.
 Valerio Massimo Manfredi's 2002 historical novel  L'ultima legione (The Last Legion) depicts the Ninth Legion as being part of the legend of King Arthur.
 Jim Butcher's Codex Alera fantasy series (2004–2009) is populated by the descendants of the Ninth Legion and its camp followers, who were transported to the world of Carna.
 The 2006 album Caledonia by German Celtic metal band Suidakra includes a song "The IXth Legion" about the legion's fight with the Picts.
 The 2007 movie The Last Legion based upon the Manfredi novel.
 In Stephen Lorne Bennett's 2010 historical novel Last of the Ninth the Ninth Legion is destroyed by the Parthians under General Chosroes, in Cappadocia in 161 AD.
 The 2010 movie Centurion follows the destiny of the Ninth Legion, as seen from the perspective of centurion Quintus Dias.
 The 2011 movie The Eagle is based on the book The Eagle of the Ninth.
 The 2013 book The Eagle has Fallen written by Brian Young also subscribes to the theory that the Legion was destroyed in Britain.
 The 2017 Doctor Who episode "The Eaters of Light" features the remnants of the Ninth Legion, which was wiped out by an extradimensional being.
 In Marc Alan Edelheit's 2017 book Lost Legio IX: The Karus Saga the remains of the IXth, about to be destroyed by the native Britons, find themselves transported to another planet where they will rebuild a Roman civilization.
In the TV series Britannia
 In Kate Atkinson's novel Behind the Scenes at the Museum, set in 20th century York, the ghosts of the members of Legio IX – together with those of people from other periods in York's history – celebrate the Coronation of Queen Elizabeth II in 1953 and raise aloft their legion's Eagle in the new Queen's honour.
 In Robert Kroese's Alternative history "The Iron Dragon" series, the 9th is wiped out when time travellers, escaping the Judean Revolt, drop a malfunctioning proton reactor on them.
 In the lore of the SCP Foundation web series, the 9th Legion is revealed to have been destroyed by SCP-682 during experiments using the anomaly SCP-978.
 In the film Horrible Histories: The Movie - Rotten Romans released in 2019, part of the story includes Legion IX Hispana or as it is nicknamed in it "The IX Men" as one of the main characters is sent to serve in it in Britain as a punishment after upsetting the emperor.

See also

 List of people who disappeared
List of Roman legions
Castra
Limes (Roman Empire)
Structural history of the Roman military
Silchester eagle

References

External links

Military units and formations established in the 1st century BC
Military units and factions of the Bar Kokhba revolt
Missing person cases in the United Kingdom
09 Hispana
9 Hispana